Albrycht Radziwiłł may refer to:
 , son of Elżbieta Szydłowiecka and Mikołaj Krzysztof Radziwiłł
 Albrycht Stanisław Radziwiłł (1595–1656)
 Albrycht Władysław Radziwiłł (1589–1636)